Burmese may refer to:

 Something of, from, or related to Myanmar, a country in Southeast Asia
 Burmese people
 Burmese language
 Burmese alphabet
 Burmese cuisine
 Burmese culture

Animals
 Burmese cat
 Burmese chicken
 Burmese (horse), a horse given to Queen Elizabeth II
 Burmese pony, a breed of horse
 Burmese python

See also 
 
 :Category:Burmese people
 Bamar people, the majority ethnic group in Myanmar
 Burmese English, the dialect of English spoken in Myanmar/Burma
 Bernese (disambiguation)

Language and nationality disambiguation pages